The 2016 Derby City Council election took place on 5 May 2016 to elect members of Derby City Council in England. This was on the same day as other local elections. The Labour Party retained control of the council, albeit with their majority reduced to just one seat.

Overall results

All comparisons in vote share are to the corresponding 2012 election.

At the previous election the composition of the council was:

After the election the composition of the council was:

Ward results

Abbey

Allestree

Alvaston

Arboretum

Blagreaves

Boulton

Chaddesden

Chellaston

Darley

Derwent

Littleover

Mackworth

Mickleover

Normanton

Oakwood

Sinfin

Spondon

References

2016 English local elections
2016
2010s in Derby